

Business 
 Park Royal Vehicles, UK manufacturer
 Pearl River Valley Railroad
 PRV engine, a V6 automobile engine
 Swedish Patent and Registration Office

Places 
 Přerov Airport, Czech Republic, IATA code
 Prime View stop, Hong Kong, MTR station code

Science 
 Peak reverse voltage of a diode
 Pressure relief valve
 Pseudorabies virus (PrV), a herpes-like virus affecting swine
 Piscine Reovirus, an orthoreovirus of salmon

Other 
 Parti radical valoisen, a political party in France